Pancheria humboldtiana is a species of shrub in the family Cunoniaceae. It is endemic to New Caledonia where it is rare and found only on a few mountains.

References

humboldtiana
Endemic flora of New Caledonia
Conservation dependent plants
Near threatened biota of Oceania
Taxonomy articles created by Polbot